Martin Ramirez Sostre (March 20, 1923 – August 12, 2015) was an American activist known for his role in the prisoners' rights movement. He was recognized as a prisoner of conscience by Amnesty International.

Biography

He served time in Attica prison during the early 1960s, where he embraced doctrines as diverse as Black Muslimism, Black nationalism, Internationalism, and finally anarchism. In 1966 Sostre opened the first Afro-Asian Bookstore at 1412 Jefferson in Buffalo, New York. For its somewhat short existence, Sostre's bookstore was a center for radical thought and education in Buffalo's Black community. As Sostre details:

Sostre was arrested at his bookstore on July 14, 1967, for "narcotics, riot, arson, and assault", charges later proven to be fabricated, part of a COINTELPRO program. He was convicted and sentenced to serve forty-one years and thirty days. Sostre became a jailhouse lawyer, regularly acting as legal counsel to other inmates and winning two landmark legal cases involving prisoner rights: Sostre v. Rockefeller and Sostre v. Otis. According to Sostre, these decisions constituted "a resounding defeat for the establishment who will now find it exceedingly difficult to torture with impunity the thousands of captive black (and white) political prisoners illegally held in their concentration camps."

Sostre was placed in solitary confinement for more than 5 years. In earlier legal activity, Sostre secured religious rights for Black Muslim prisoners and also eliminated (in the words of Federal Judge Constance Motley) some of the more "outrageously inhuman aspects of solitary confinement in some of the state prisons." He was responsible for de-legitimatizing censorship of inmates' mail, invasive bodily exams, and penal solitary confinement.

In December 1973 Amnesty International put Sostre on its "prisoner of conscience" list, stating: "We became convinced that Martin Sostre has been the victim of an international miscarriage of justice because of his political beliefs ... not for his crimes ." In addition to numerous defense committees in New York State, a Committee to Free Martin Sostre, made up of prominent citizens, joined in an effort to publicize Sostre's case and petition the New York Governor Hugh Carey for his release. On December 7, 1975, Russian Nobel Peace Laureate Andrei Sakharov added his name to the clemency appeal. Governor Carey granted Sostre clemency on Christmas Eve of 1975; Sostre was released from prison in February 1976.

Sostre died on August 12, 2015.

Legacy 

Lorenzo Kom'boa Ervin attributes his initial interest in anarchism to Sostre.

In 1974 Pacific Street Films debuted a documentary film on Sostre called Frame-up! The Imprisonment of Martin Sostre. It detailed Sostre's case with extensive interviews from prison.

In November 2017, the Frank E. Merriweather Jr. Library hosted To and From 1967: A Rebellion with Martin Sostre, an event commemorating the 50th anniversary of the Black rebellion on Buffalo's eastside. The event included an installation created by local eastside artist called Reviving Sostre. The installation consisted of three bookshelves painted by the artists and placed in the lobby of the Merriweather Library, which was built on the same location one of Sostre's bookstore used to stand.

Mariam Kaba has recently published a valuable appreciation of Martin Sostre.

See also
Anarcho-communism
Civil rights
Libertarian socialism

References and sources
References

Sources
 
 
 
 
 
 
 
 
 
 

1923 births
2015 deaths
20th-century African-American people
Activists from Buffalo, New York
African-American anarchists
African-American people
American prisoners and detainees
Amnesty International prisoners of conscience held by the United States
American people convicted of arson
American people convicted of assault
American people convicted of drug offenses
COINTELPRO targets
People from Harlem
Political prisoners
Political prisoners in the United States
Prisoners and detainees of New York (state)
Wrongful convictions